The Biertan is a left tributary of the river Târnava Mare in Romania. It discharges into the Târnava Mare in Șaroș pe Târnave near Dumbrăveni.

References

Rivers of Romania
Rivers of Sibiu County